Samuel Aguilar Solís (born 17 June 1956) is a Mexican politician from the Institutional Revolutionary Party. He has served as Deputy of the LVIII and LX Legislatures of the Mexican Congress  and as Senator of the LVI and LVII Legislatures representing Durango.

References

1956 births
Living people
Politicians from Durango
Members of the Senate of the Republic (Mexico)
Members of the Chamber of Deputies (Mexico)
Institutional Revolutionary Party politicians
21st-century Mexican politicians
Autonomous University of Coahuila alumni
Academic staff of the Autonomous University of Coahuila
Academic staff of Universidad Iberoamericana
Members of the Congress of Durango
20th-century Mexican politicians